Argo is a town in Jefferson and St. Clair counties, Alabama, United States. It incorporated in 1987. At the 2020 census, the population was 4,368.

Geography

Argo is located at  (33.700210, -86.512357).

Demographics

Argo first appeared on the 1990 U.S. Census as an incorporated town.

2000 Census data
At the 2000 census, there were 1,780 people, 664 households, and 501 families living in the town. The population density is 146.3 people per square mile (56.5/km2). The racial makeup of the town was 98.82% White, 0.17% Black or African American, 0.06% Native American, 0.06% Asian, 0.06% Pacific Islander, and 0.84% from two or more races. 0.73% of the population were Hispanic or Latino of any race.

Of the 664 households 39.3% had children under the age of 18 living with them, 65.5% were married couples living together, 6.3% had a female householder with no husband present, and 24.4% were non-families. 21.4% of households were one person and 7.4% were one person aged 65 or older. The average household size was 2.68 and the average family size was 3.14.

The age distribution was 28.0% under the age of 18, 6.5% from 18 to 24, 33.8% from 25 to 44, 23.1% from 45 to 64, and 8.6% 65 or older. The median age was 36 years. For every 100 females, there were 108.7 males. For every 100 females age 18 and over, there were 104.8 males.

The median household income was $41,167 and the median family income  was $53,088. Males had a median income of $33,875 versus $28,625 for females. The per capita income for the town was $18,226. About 7.5% of families and 8.6% of the population were below the poverty line, including 8.1% of those under age 18 and 15.0% of those age 65 or over.

2010 census
At the 2010 census, there were 4,071 people, 1,393 households, and 583 families living in the town. The population density is 333.7 people per square mile (129.2/km2). The racial makeup of the town was 94.1% White, 3.6% Black or African American, 0.4% Native American, 0.3% Asian, 0.1% Pacific Islander, and 1.3% from two or more races. 0.5% of the population were Hispanic or Latino of any race.

Of the 1,393 households 41.9% had children under the age of 18 living with them, 70.3% were married couples living together, 8.5% had a female householder with no husband present, and 17.1% were non-families. 14.0% of households were one person and 4.4% were one person aged 65 or older. The average household size was 2.92 and the average family size was 3.22.

The age distribution was 29.2% under the age of 18, 6.9% from 18 to 24, 31.7% from 25 to 44, 24.2% from 45 to 64, and 8.1% 65 or older. The median age was 34.6 years. For every 100 females, there were 99.6 males. For every 100 females age 18 and over, there were 98.4 males.

The median household income was $53,917 and the median family income  was $60,313. Males had a median income of $39,000 versus $35,072 for females. The per capita income for the town was $21,409. About 8.2% of families and 9.2% of the population were below the poverty line, including 14.3% of those under age 18 and 2.8% of those age 65 or over.

2020 census

As of the 2020 United States census, there were 4,368 people, 1,348 households, and 1,146 families residing in the town.

Historic Demographics

References

Notes

References

External links
Argo page on St Clair CO. Site

Towns in Jefferson County, Alabama
Towns in St. Clair County, Alabama
Towns in Alabama
Populated places established in 1987
Birmingham metropolitan area, Alabama
U.S. Route 11